Game Room was a social gaming service for the Xbox 360 video game system, Microsoft Windows PCs, and Windows Phone 7. Launched on March 24, 2010, Game Room let players download classic video games and compete against each other for high scores. Players on both Xbox 360 and Windows PCs could access Game Room through their respective versions of Microsoft's Live online services (Xbox Live and Games for Windows – Live). The servers shut down on October 31, 2017.

At the 2011 Consumer Electronics Show, Microsoft announced a mobile version of Game Room for Windows Phone 7. Asteroids Deluxe was the only game announced, but a show floor demo revealed working prototypes of Centipede and Shao-Lin's Road.

Format
The Game Room front end can be downloaded at no charge from Microsoft's Marketplace online storefront. When launched, players are presented with a three-story virtual video arcade, each story containing four separate rooms. These rooms may be decorated however the player wishes, using the included themes and set pieces. The player can fill the rooms with virtual game cabinets that are used to play arcade and console games downloaded through the service, with each room holding a maximum of eight cabinets.

Games for Game Room are made available through downloadable game packs. While the packs are free to download, individual games must be purchased in order to be played fully. Players may play each game in the pack once without charge, limited to ten minutes of game time. Games are purchased on a game-by-game basis, which allows unlimited play of the game.

Previously, this was limited to Xbox 360 or Games for Windows, but a late update removed this distinction, defaulting the game purchases to the previous "Play Anywhere" model (a multiplatform spending model that would be expanded years later for Xbox One and Windows 10 as Xbox Play Anywhere).

Gameplay
Games in Game Room are launched by selecting them while players browse through their arcade. Each game offers a "classic mode", where one can set a number of gameplay options, dependent on the game's format. Arcade games have DIP switches that may be changed in order to increase difficulty or offer additional lives to the player, while console games have their original gameplay variations. Both are accessible using Game Room's on-screen interfaces.

Also, some games can be played in a special "ranked mode," which allows scores to be posted to online leaderboards while limiting gameplay options to a single variation common to all players, as well as disallowing several Game Room options, seemingly to prevent falsifying rankings or other forms of cheating.

While browsing their arcades, players see avatars of themselves and their online friends wandering around and playing the games; Xbox 360 players see their console avatars, while PC players see generic avatars instead. Similarly, players may visit the arcades of their online friends as well as play the games found there. If a friend's arcade has a game that the player does not own, the player may purchase plays or may use their in-game tokens. However, the player may play copies of a game they already own for free. Players may also challenge their friends at various games in both score-based and skill-based contests.

During gameplay, players win medals based on their score or how long they have played the game (both for that individual play and all-time on that game). Medals are offered in gold, silver and bronze, with each being worth a certain number of points. As players earn medals, they can advance in levels, which will unlock new themes and set pieces to be used in their arcades. Like other LIVE titles, players also earn achievements based on their gameplay.

Game selection
The initial game pack releases for Game Room were a mix of arcade, Intellivision, and Atari 2600 games. Other arcade machines were also to be covered, with Microsoft promising at least 1000 virtual arcade cabinets over the subsequent three years. Despite Microsoft's promise, there have not been any new games or other content since Game Pack 13 was released on December 22, 2010. Initially, Microsoft announced plans to release game packs weekly, starting on April 28, 2010, although the first new release did not take place until May 5, 2010.

Available games

Additional themes
Along with the several pre-loaded themes available at the start in Game Room, Microsoft has added other themes in the game packs. Unlike many of the pre-loaded themes, which require the player to have attained a certain level in order to be used, these themes are available to be used immediately.

References

External links

2010 video games
Games for Windows
Online video game services
Xbox 360 software
Video game compilations
Krome Studios